Fungochitina is an extinct genus of chitinozoans. It was described by Taugourdeau in 1966.

Species
 Fungochitina fungiformis (Eisenack, 1931)
 Fungochitina kosovensis Paris et Křiž, 1984
 Fungochitina pistilliformis (Eisenack, 1931)
 Fungochitina spinifera (Eisenack, 1962)

References

Prehistoric marine animals
Fossil taxa described in 1966